PT SGMW Motor Indonesia (also called SAIC-General Motors-Wuling Motor Indonesia or simply Wuling Motors Indonesia) is a subsidiary wholly owned by SAIC-GM-Wuling Automobile (SGMW), a joint venture between SAIC Motor, General Motors and Liuzhou Wuling Motors Co Ltd to handle their Indonesian operations. It is the first Chinese automotive company to build a manufacturing plant in Indonesia.

Unlike their operations in China, SGMW Indonesia only marketed vehicles one marque, Wuling Motors, instead of both Wuling and Baojun. In 2018, Wuling Motors is the ninth largest automotive manufacturing company in Indonesia and the sixth largest passenger car manufacturing company in Indonesia by sales and production, according to the Association of Indonesia Automotive Industry (Gaikindo).

History 
The company started its operation by building its first plant in Greenland International Industrial Center in Cikarang, Bekasi Regency, West Java province on August 20, 2015. Built on a 600,000 m2 land including the supplier park, the plant was built for the production and manufacture of automobile in Indonesia and to set up an export base for Southeast Asia. The investment of the project is around US$700 million. The plant is expected to produce up to 150,000 vehicles in a year in its maximum capacity and is estimated to create 3,000 jobs for Indonesia.

In August 2016, SGMW Motor Indonesia joined the 2016 Gaikindo Indonesia International Auto Show and showcased the Wuling Hongguang S1 and Baojun 730. On July 11, 2017, the plant officially started its operations for mass production and was inaugurated by the vice president of Indonesia, Jusuf Kalla. Their first product was a compact MPV named Confero, which is a rebadged Hongguang S1. Initial pricing started at Rp 128 million, making it the cheapest MPV in its respective class. At the end of 2017, Wuling Motors quickly climbed into the top-10 car brand in Indonesia by production and sales.

On February 9, 2018, the company launched the Cortez, a rebadged Baojun 730. On November 7, 2018, Wuling launched the Formo as a commercial variant of the Confero. At the end of 2018, Wuling missed the targeted vehicle sales of 30,000 units, instead recorded 17,002 units for the wholesales figure and 15,162 units for the retail sales figure.

On February 27, 2019, Wuling unveiled the Almaz, a rebadged Baojun 530 as their first SUV in Indonesia. Wuling announced that it would export Almaz to Thailand, Brunei and Fiji as the Chevrolet Captiva.

Models

Sales

References

External links 
 Wuling Motors Indonesia official website (in Indonesian)
 Wuling Motors Indonesia official website (in English)

Car manufacturers of Indonesia
Organizations based in West Java
SAIC-GM-Wuling
SAIC Motor joint ventures
SAIC Motor